SV Röchling Völklingen is a German association football club that plays in Völklingen, part of the greater Saarbrücken, Saarland.

The club draws its name from the Röchling family, owners of the Völklingen Ironworks steel factory, a former sponsor of the club which closed down in 1986.

History
The club was founded as FC Völklingen on 26 April 1906 and renamed SV Völklingen in 1912 before folding in 1916 as a consequence of the fighting along the frontier with France in World War I. In 1919 the club was re-founded as VfB Völklingen and played in the Kreisliga Saar, before taking on its old name again later in the year. Like most organizations across Germany, including sports and football teams, SVV was dissolved after World War II at the direction of the occupying Allied authorities.

Reconstituted after the war as SuSG Völklingen, the club suffered through an unsuccessful 1947–48 season in the Oberliga Südwest, before playing for three seasons from 1949 to 1951 in the Ehrenliga Saarland, a rump football league established by the occupying French authorities as a manifestation in sport of a more general attempt to have the German state of Saarland join France or become a separate country. This affected a number of German clubs and resulted in Saarland being represented by separate teams in the Olympics and the 1954 World Cup. Renamed SV Völklingen in 1951 the team played the balance of the postwar period in the Amateurliga Saarland (III) until advancing to the 2nd Oberliga Südwest in 1961.

With the formation in 1963 of the Bundesliga, Germany's new top-flight professional league, and the related restructuring of the country's football leagues, Völklingen found itself in the Regionalliga Südwest (II). The team enjoyed its greatest successes in the early-1970s when it earned second-place finishes in the 1972 and 1973 seasons, but was unable to advance in two related attempts through the promotion rounds to the Bundesliga. The club also advanced to the quarter-finals of the 1975–76 German Cup before bowing out to Hertha BSC Berlin 2–1 in a replay. Through the latter part of the decade the club struggled to avoid relegation, but had already begun a descent that would take them as far down as the Landesliga Saarland-SW (VI) by 1994. SV Völklingen currently play in the Oberliga Rheinland-Pfalz/Saar (V).

Stadium
Völklingens Hermann Neuberger Stadium was built in 1912 and had a grandstand added in 1955. Its capacity was doubled to accommodate 16,000 spectators when the club joined the 2. Bundesliga in 1974, making it the fourth largest stadium in Saarland.

Honours
The club's honours:
 Oberliga Südwest (III)
 Champions: 1979
 Amateurliga Saarland (III)
 Champions: 1960, 1961
 Verbandsliga Saarland (IV–V)
 Champions: 1983, 2002
 Saarlandliga' (VI)
 Champions: 2011

Recent seasons
The recent season-by-season performance of the club:

 With the introduction of the Regionalligas in 1994 and the 3. Liga in 2008 as the new third tier, below the 2. Bundesliga, all leagues below dropped one tier. The Saarlandliga was introduced in 2009 and replaced the Verbandsliga Saarland at the sixth tier of football in the Saarland. In 2012 the Oberliga Südwest was renamed Oberliga Rheinland-Pfalz/Saar.

References

External links
 Official club website 
 The Abseits Guide to German Soccer
 SV Röchling Völklingen at Weltfussball.de

Football clubs in Germany
Football clubs in Saarland
Association football clubs established in 1906
1906 establishments in Germany
Saarbrücken (district)
2. Bundesliga clubs